{{chembox
| Verifiedfields = changed
| Watchedfields = changed
| verifiedrevid = 487305398
| ImageFile = Carmustine.svg
| ImageFile_Ref = 
| ImageName = Skeletal formula of carmustine
| ImageFile1 = Carmustine ball-and-stick.png
| ImageName1 = Ball-and-stick model of carmustine molecule
| IUPACName = 1,3-Bis(2-chloroethyl)-1-nitrosourea
| OtherNames = N,''N-Bis(2-chloroethyl)-N-nitrosourea, bis-chloroethylnitrosourea, BCNU
|Section1=
|Section2=
|Section6=
|Section7=
|Section8=
}}Carmustine, sold under the brand name BiCNU''' among others, is a medication used mainly for chemotherapy. It is a nitrogen mustard β-chloro-nitrosourea compound used as an alkylating agent.

Description
Carmustine is an orange-yellow solid medication used mainly for chemotherapy. It is a nitrogen mustard β-chloro-nitrosourea compound.

Mechanism of action
As an alkylating agent, carmustine can form interstrand crosslinks in DNA, which prevents DNA replication and DNA transcription.

Uses
Carmustine is used as an alkylating agent to treat several types of brain cancer including glioma, glioblastoma multiforme, medulloblastoma and astrocytoma), multiple myeloma, and lymphoma (Hodgkin's and non-Hodgkin).

Carmustine is sometimes used in conjunction with alkyl guanine transferase (AGT) inhibitors, such as O6-benzylguanine. The AGT-inhibitors increase the efficacy of carmustine by inhibiting the direct reversal pathway of DNA repair, which will prevent formation of the interstrand crosslink between the N1 of guanine and the N3 of cytosine.

It is also used as part of a chemotherapeutic protocol in preparation for hematological stem cell transplantation, a type of bone marrow transplant, in order to reduce the white blood cell count in the recipient. Use under this protocol, usually with fludarabine and melphalan, was developed by oncologists at the University of Texas MD Anderson Cancer Center.

Implants
In the treatment of brain tumours, the U.S. Food and Drug Administration (FDA) approved biodegradable discs infused with carmustine (Gliadel). They are implanted under the skull during a surgery called a craniotomy. The disc allows for controlled release of carmustine in the extracellular fluid of the brain, thus eliminating the need for the encapsulated drug to cross the blood-brain barrier.

Production
Carmustine for injection was marketed under the name BiCNU by Bristol-Myers Squibb and now by Emcure Pharmaceuticals.  In India it is sold under various brand names, including Consium..  The product is available as a generic version with other manufacturers offering the product licensed in the US and EU markets.

See also 
Bendamustine
Lomustine
Semustine

References

External links 
 
 

Orphan drugs
Ureas
Nitrosoureas
Alkylating antineoplastic agents
IARC Group 2A carcinogens
Organochlorides
Cancer treatments
Chloroethyl compounds
X